Chapman is an unincorporated community in Rusk County, located in the U.S. state of Texas. According to the Handbook of Texas, the community had a population of 20 in 2000. It is located within the Longview, Texas metropolitan area.

History
Chapman was named for John Chapman and his family, the first settlers in the area. Henry Chapman participated in the Battle of San Jacinto. Francis M. Bridges was appointed postmaster in 1894 and served until its closure in 1904 when mail was sent to Henderson. The population of Chapman jumped from a low of 12 in 1895 to 150 in 1940. It then went down to 12 from 1967 through 2000. It had three businesses and a community center in the mid-1980s. The community originally went by the name Blossom Hill.

Geography

Education
Today, the community is served by the Henderson Independent School District.

Notes

Unincorporated communities in Cherokee County, Texas
Unincorporated communities in Texas